The Hereford Academy is a secondary school and sixth form located in Hereford, Herefordshire, England.

It was known as Haywood High School in the late seventies until 2006, when it was renamed as Wyebridge Sports College. On 1 September 2008 it was renamed The Hereford Academy. It has been, like Whitecross Hereford High School re-classified as a Sports College. The Academy's new building opened in September 2011, and the demolition of the old school site, making way for new playing fields to be laid out, was completed in Spring 2012. Sixth form is located in the school as it is called "Post 16", students here are aged 16 and exceeded 18 years of age.

Maths, English and P.E. are 'key topics' and other topics (French, Music, History, Geography and PHSE) are either repeated twice or remain single. There are places called "ELZ" in history, Science, Maths and technology.

The punishments are called a 'C System' many children who give out a bad behaviour are given a C1, this gives them a warning and have house points taken away. A C2 is a second warning and more house points are removed. The C3 is an hour detention as children will wait until 4 PM. C4 is reflection. C5 is exclusion, permanent or term.

There are six forms: Atlas, Castor, Deneb, Mizar, Rigel and Sirius. The forms are named after stars bigger than the Sun. First is Year 7 will be 7Atlas or 7Deneb etc. This is for all of the years until 6th form.

School starts at 8:30 and finishes at 15:00 apart from a Monday where students still start at 8:30 but finish at 14:15.

References

External links
Official website

Secondary schools in Herefordshire
Schools in Hereford
Academies in Herefordshire